Jack Falls is a 2011 British independent feature film starring Simon Phillips, Jason Flemying, Dexter Fletcher, Alan Ford, Adam Deacon, Martin Kemp, Tamer Hassan, Olivia Hallinan, Doug Bradley, Jing Lusi and Zach Galligan and the third installment in the Jack Says Trilogy, the first ever British film trilogy according to the British Film Institute. Based on the graphic novel of the same title by Paul Tanter, the movie is a contemporary film noir shot in London in high contrast black and white with splashes of colour particularly reminiscent of the Robert Rodriguez film Sin City, but with a harder, grittier edge. Although a stand-alone film, it follows on from the films Jack Says and Jack Said.

Plot
Surviving a murder attempt in Amsterdam, former undercover police officer Jack Adleth returns to London to seek revenge and settle some old scores, but he soon finds himself in danger not just from his former criminal associates, but his old police colleagues too. As he battles to stay alive, he must also deal with the guilt from the consequences of his undercover life.

Cast 
Simon Phillips as  Jack Adleth 
Tamer Hassan as  The Boss 
Jason Flemying as Damien
Alan Ford as Carter
Dexter Fletcher as Detective Edwards
Adam Deacon as Hogan
Martin Kemp as Dr Lawrence 
Christopher Fosh as Dave
Olivia Hallinan as Natasha
Jing Lusi as Carly
Doug Bradley as The Doctor
Rita Ramnani as Erin
Neil Maskell as Sid

External links 
 
 
 

2011 films
British crime films
Films set in London
British independent films
2010s English-language films
2010s British films